The Vaishnava Upanishads are minor Upanishads of Hinduism, related to Vishnu theology (Vaishnavism). There are 14 Vaishnava Upanishads in the Muktika anthology of 108 Upanishads. They, along with other minor Upanishads, are generally classified separate from the thirteen major Principal Upanishads considered to be more ancient and from the Vedic tradition.

The Vaishnava Upanishads also contrast from other groups of minor Upanishads, such as the Samanya Upanishads, which are of a generic nature, the Sannyasa Upanishads, which focus on the Hindu renunciation and monastic practice, the Yoga Upanishads related to Yoga, the Shaiva Upanishads, which highlight aspects of Shaivism, and the Shakta Upanishads, which highlight Shaktism.

These Upanishads propound Vishnu, Narayana, Rama, or one of his avatars as the supreme metaphysical reality called Brahman in Hinduism. They discuss a diverse range of topics, from ethics, to the methods of worship.

Some of the Vaishnava Upanishads exist in more than one version, each version attached to a different Veda depending on the region their manuscript has been discovered. Furthermore, scholars disagree on which minor Upanishads are Vaishnava; for example, Deussen classifies Maha Upanishad as a Vaishnava Upanishad, but Tinoco lists it as a Samanya Upanishad.

Date
The composition date of each Vaishnava Upanishad is unclear, and estimates on when they were composed vary with scholar. According to Mahony, the minor Upanishads are approximately dated to be from about 100 BCE to 1100 CE.

According to Ramdas Lamb, associate professor of religion at the University of Hawaii, the sectarian Upanishads which are the post-Vedic scriptures are not easily datable due to their very nature of  the "multiple layers of material". Of these Upanishads the Purva Nrisimha Tapaniya and Uttara Tapaniya Upanishads, which are part of the Nrisimha Tapaniya Upanishadas, are the earliest dated to before the seventh century CE.

Patrick Olivelle states that sectarian Upanishads attached to Atharvaveda – which include some Vaishnava Upanishads – were likely composed in the second millennium, until about the 16th century.

List
The fourteen Vaishnava Upanishads are:

See also
Hindu texts
Puranas

References

Bibliography

Upanishads